Omicron Persei (ο Persei, abbreviated Omicron Per, ο Per) is a triple star system in the constellation of Perseus. From parallax measurements taken during the Hipparcos mission it is approximately 1,100 light-years (330 parsecs) from the Sun.

The system consists of a spectroscopic binary pair designated Omicron Persei A and a third companion Omicron Persei B.  A's two components are themselves designated Omicron Persei Aa (officially named Atik , the traditional name of the system) and Ab.

Etymology 

ο Persei (Latinised to Omicron Persei) is the system's Bayer designation. The designations of the two constituents as Omicron Persei A and B, and those of A's components - Omicron Persei Aa and Ab - derive from the convention used by the Washington Multiplicity Catalog (WMC) for multiple star systems, and adopted by the International Astronomical Union (IAU).

It bore the traditional name Atik (also Ati, Al Atik), Arabic for "the shoulder". Some sources attribute the name Atik to the nearby, brighter star Zeta Persei. In 2016, the International Astronomical Union organized a Working Group on Star Names (WGSN) to catalogue and standardize proper names for stars. The WGSN decided to attribute proper names to individual stars rather than entire multiple systems. It approved the name Atik for the component Omicron Persei A on 12 September 2016 and it is now so included in the List of IAU-approved Star Names.

Properties

Omicron Persei A is a spectroscopic binary consisting of a spectral type B1 giant and a type B2 dwarf orbiting each other every 4.4 days. The orbit is near-circular although its inclination is not precisely known. The primary is approximately one magnitude brighter than the secondary at visual wavelengths. The binary pair forms a rotating ellipsoidal variable star, which varies in brightness from visual magnitude 3.79 to 3.88 during the orbital period.

Omicron Persei lies just north of the open cluster IC 348, but is not catalogued as a member.  Both IC 348 and Omicron Persei belong to the Perseus OB2 association.

Culture 
 In the TV series Futurama, the fictional planet Omicron Persei 8 is home to medicinal plants, and large aliens who often attack Earth.
 The USS Atik was a ship of the United States Navy.

See also
Stars and planetary systems in fiction

References

External links
Atik

Perseus (constellation)
Persei, Omicron
B-type giants
B-type main-sequence stars
Spectroscopic binaries
Atik
Persei, 38
1131
023180
017448
Durchmusterung objects